Marty Grimes (born 1962) is a goofy-footed professional American skateboarder from Los Angeles. He is one of the original Los Angeles pool rippers, riding for Dogtown and Zephyr skateboards. Grimes and his brother were the first African-American professional skateboarders, as they both went pro at the same time.

Early life 
Grimes grew up in Midtown, Los Angeles. He went to Mar Vista Elementary, where they had a large embankment that Grimes would grow up to skate. At age 10, a family member introduced Grimes to skating. Additionally, as part of the LAUSD desegregation busing, Grimes attended Paul Revere Junior High in Pacific Palisades, which had one of the best banks in the city, a popular skate spot.

Skateboarding 
After competing in the 1975 Del Mar Skateboard Championships, Marty and his brother, Clyde, were offered sponsorships on the EZ Ryder team. Grimes is the first black skater to have a signature model.

References

External links 
A Pro Skater Has Written the First Good Skateboarding Book for Kids – VICE
My First Skateboard Book

1962 births
American skateboarders
Living people
African-American skateboarders
21st-century African-American people
20th-century African-American sportspeople